Rodney Heath defeated Albert Curtis, 4–6, 6–3, 6–4, 6–4, in the final to win the men's singles tennis title at the 1905 Australasian Championships. The event was played on Grass courts in Melbourne, Australia at Warehouseman's Cricket Ground. It was the inaugural edition of the tournament and took place in November 1905.

Draw

Finals

Top half

Bottom half

References

External links
 

 

1905 in Australian tennis
Men's Singles